Vitichi is a location in the Potosí Department in Bolivia. It is the capital of the Vitichi Municipality, the second municipal section of the Nor Chichas Province.

References

Populated places in Potosí Department